A turnstile is a pedestrian gate.

Turnstile may also refer to:

Turnstile (symbol), symbol used in mathematics, logic, and computer science
Turnstiles (album), a 1976 studio album by Billy Joel
Turnstile antenna, set of two dipole antennas
Optical turnstile, physical security device
TURNSTILE, a codename for the UK's Central Government War Headquarters
Turnstile (band), a hardcore punk band
The Turnstile, a 1912 novel by A. E. W. Mason
 in the fiction movie Tenet (film), a device that inverts entropy

See also 
Turn Style, retail store
Turnstyle (band), a band from Perth, Western Australia